The term "Marcinelle school" or "Charleroi school" (École de Charleroi) refers to a group of Belgian cartoonists formed by Joseph Gillain (known as Jijé) following World War II. The first generation, known as the "Bande à quatre" ("Gang of four"), consisted of Jijé and his assistants Franquin, Morris and Will. Marcinelle school cartoonists were all associated with the weekly magazine, Spirou, whose offices in the 1940s were located in the town of Marcinelle, near Charleroi in Belgium.

The style of these cartoonists soon became the preferred in-house style for artists working at the influential Spirou magazine, and thus had a huge impact on the Belgian comics and Franco-Belgian comics scene, inspiring generations of cartoonists.

Style

Stylistically, the Marcinelle school is a mix of cartoonish and realist, and is also sometimes called comic-dynamic ("comic" here refers to "comical", not the medium). It is often cited in books in opposition to Hergé's ligne claire style.  Though these two styles have much in common, Marcinelle school is all about conveying the impression of movement, while ligne claire tends to be more schematic.

List of artists

The artists most closely associated to the Marcinelle school are:
Joseph Gillain (Jijé)
André Franquin
Maurice de Bevere (Morris)
Willy Maltaite (Will)
Eddy Paape
Pierre Culliford (Peyo)
Jean Roba
Victor Hubinon

Other artists considered part of the School include:
Jean de Mesmaeker (Jidéhem)
Paul Deliège
Pierre Seron
Maurice Tillieux
François Walthéry

References

External links
Dupuis page on Jijé discussing the core group and characteristics of the Marcinelle school

Belgian comics
Bandes dessinées
Comics terminology
Belgian inventions